Amos Whitney (October 8, 1832 – August 5, 1920) was a mechanical engineer and inventor who co-founded the Pratt & Whitney company.  He was a member of the prominent Whitney family.

He was born in Biddeford, Maine to Aaron and Rebecca (Perkins) Whitney and educated at the common schools in Saccarappa, Maine and Exeter, New Hampshire.  He moved at the age of 14 with his parents to Lawrence, Massachusetts and apprenticed at the Essex Machine Company.

In 1852, he moved to Hartford, Connecticut and worked at the Colt Armory.  At Colt, he met Francis A. Pratt who soon left to become superintendent at the Phoenix Iron Works and took Whitney with him.  While working at Phoenix Iron Works, Whitney designed the Lincoln milling machine.

In 1860, while still working at the Phoenix Iron Works, Pratt and Whitney formed the Pratt & Whitney company.  Their first product was a thread winder for the Willimantic Linen Company.  They went on to manufacture machine tools for the manufacture of guns, sewing machines, bicycles and typewriters.  The manufacturing of gun making machinery rapidly increased during the American Civil War.

In 1893, Whitney was made vice-president of the company and worked as president from 1898 to 1901.  The company was acquired by the Niles-Bement-Pond Company and Whitney remained as one of the directors.  He also worked as president and director of the Gray Telephone Pay Station Company, director of the Pratt & Cady Co., director in the Co-operative Savings Bank and as treasurer of Whitney Manufacturing Company which was organized by his son Clarence.

He died on August 5, 1920 in Poland Spring, Maine and was interred at Cedar Hill Cemetery in Hartford, Connecticut.

See also
Whitney family

References

External links
 Pratt & Whitney Measurement Systems Website

1832 births
1920 deaths
20th-century American businesspeople
19th-century American inventors
American Civil War industrialists
American company founders
American mechanical engineers
Burials at Cedar Hill Cemetery (Hartford, Connecticut)
Businesspeople from Hartford, Connecticut
Machine tool builders
People from Biddeford, Maine